Antónia Moreira de Fátima (born 26 April 1982 in Luanda), nicknamed Faia, is an Angolan judoka.

She competed in the +70 kg division at the 2004 Summer Olympics and lost in the round of 16 to Kim Ryon-Mi of North Korea.

Moreira also won medals at the 2004 and 2005 African Judo Championships (gold in 2004, silver in 2005) as well as bronze medals at the 2007 All-Africa Games and the 2008 African Judo Championships and a gold medal at the 2015 African Games.

At the 2012 Olympic Games, she competed in the -70 kg division, and was knocked out in the second round by eventual bronze medallist Yuri Alvear.

At the 2016 Summer Olympics in Rio de Janeiro, she competed in the women's 70 kg division. She finished in 9th place after being defeated by Laura Vargas Koch of Germany in the second round.

References

External links
 
 
 

 Antónia Moreira at Yahoo! Sports

1982 births
Living people
Angolan female judoka
Judoka at the 2004 Summer Olympics
Judoka at the 2012 Summer Olympics
Judoka at the 2016 Summer Olympics
Olympic judoka of Angola
African Games gold medalists for Angola
African Games medalists in judo
Sportspeople from Luanda
African Games silver medalists for Angola
African Games bronze medalists for Angola
Competitors at the 2007 All-Africa Games
Competitors at the 2015 African Games
Competitors at the 2011 All-Africa Games